Bernard Frederic Bemrose Kay (23 February 1928 – 25 December 2014) was an English actor with an extensive theatre, television, and film repertoire.

Career 
Kay began his working life as a reporter for the Bolton Evening News, and a stringer for the Manchester Guardian. He was conscripted in 1946 and started acting in the army. Kay gained a scholarship to study at the Old Vic Theatre School and became a professional in 1950, as a member of the company which reopened the Old Vic after World War II.

He appeared in hundreds of TV productions including Emmerdale Farm, The Champions, The Cellar and the Almond Tree, Clayhanger, A Very British Coup, Casualty, Casualty 1909, Doctors, Z-Cars, Coronation Street, Jonathan Creek, Foyle's War and London's Burning in 1989. He also portrayed a mutant in the Space: 1999 episode "A Matter of Balance".

He portrayed Captain Stanley Lord of the SS Californian in the BBC dramatisation Trial by Inquiry: Titanic in 1967. 

The 1970s saw Kay play the role of Philip Bentley in The Protectors episode A Pocketful of Posies (1973) and appear as the underworld crime boss Harry Scott in an episode of the hard-hitting British police drama The Professionals, the episode entitled When the Heat Cools Off (1978). 

Later television credits include as bandit leader Cordova in the Zorro television episode "Alejandro Rides Again" in 1991 which was filmed in Madrid, Spain. Kay also gave a sympathetic performance as Korporal Hartwig in an early episode of Colditz.

Kay has appeared four times in the Doctor Who series in various roles, most notably as Saladin in the classic Doctor Who story The Crusade in 1965. He also appeared in the serials The Dalek Invasion of Earth (1964), The Faceless Ones (1967) and Colony in Space (1971). In 2006, he guest-starred in the Doctor Who audio adventure Night Thoughts.

His best-known film appearance was his role as a Bolshevik leader in Doctor Zhivago (1965).

Stage 
He also acted extensively on the stage. In 1952, for the Nottingham Rep, he learned, rehearsed, and played Macbeth in less than 24 hours. In 1984, he played Shylock in a British Council tour of Asia, ending in Baghdad, in the middle of the Iraq/Iran war. Other theatre includes An Inspector Calls (Garrick Theatre), Macbeth (Nottingham Playhouse), Titus Andronicus (European Tour), A Man for All Seasons (International Tour), The Merchant of Venice (International Tour), Galileo (Young Vic), Death of a Salesman (Lyric Theatre, Belfast)—for which he was nominated as best actor in the RITA awards in 1998—and Halpern and Johnson (New End Theatre). He twice appeared at the Finborough Theatre in London: in 2006 in After Haggerty and in 2010 in Dream of the Dog.

Personal life 
Bernard Kay was married to the actress Patricia Haines from 1963 until her death from cancer in 1977. He never quite recovered from her death. He died in London on 25 December 2014, at the age of 86.

Selected filmography 

 Carry On Sergeant (1958) – Injured Recruit
 Backfire (1962) – Fire Chief
 Doctor Who (1965) - Saladin
 Doctor Zhivago (1965) – The Bolshevik
 Doctor Who (1967) - Inspector Crossland
 The Lion, the Witch and the Wardrobe (1967, TV Series) - Aslan
 They Came from Beyond Space (1967) – Richard Arden
 The Shuttered Room (1967) – Tait
 Torture Garden (1967) – Dr. Heim (segment 2 "Terror Over Hollywood")
 Interlude (1968) – George Selworth
 Witchfinder General (1968) – Fisherman
 Darling Lili (1970) – Bedford
 Trog (1970) – Inspector Greenham
 Doctor Who (1971) – Caldwell
 The Hunting Party (1971) – Buford King
 Running Scared (1972) – Mr. Willis
 Lady Caroline Lamb (1972) – Benson
 The Hiding Place (1975) – Fred Koonstra
 Voyage of the Damned (1976) – Cuba Harbour pilot (uncredited)
 Spy Story (1976) – Commander Wheeler
 Sweeney! (1977) – Matthews
 Sinbad and the Eye of the Tiger (1977) – Zabid
 The Professionals (1978) – Harry Scott
 The Great Riviera Bank Robbery (1979) – Commissaire
 The Case of Marcel Duchamp (1984) 
 The Most Dangerous Man in the World (1988) – Dogan
 London's Burning (1989) - Chief Fire Officer
 A Ghost in Monte Carlo (1990) – Police Chief Gutier
 Coronation Street (1994) – Mr Phillips
 Steal This Movie (2000) – John Hoffman
 Foyle's War: The White Feather (2002) - Robert Woolton
 Puritan (2005) – The old man
 Pierrepoint: The Last Hangman (2005) – Uncle Tom
 Joy Division (2006) – Bothringaye
 Psychosis (2010) – Reverend Swan (final film role)

References

External links 

Obituary (The Independent)
Obituary (The Times)
Obituary: Bernard Kay, actor (The Scotsman)
Bolton-born Doctor Who actor Bernard Kay dies (The Bolton News)
Bernard Kay Tribute

1928 births
English male film actors
English male television actors
2014 deaths
Actors from Bolton
20th-century English male actors
21st-century English male actors
Alumni of Bristol Old Vic Theatre School